Sir Masood Ahmed  is a Pakistan-born British economist who has been serving as president of the Center for Global Development since 2017. He previously held positions in the International Monetary Fund (IMF), the World Bank and the UK Government's Department for International Development, working on areas that included international economic policy relating to debt, aid effectiveness, trade, and global economic prospects. He is an active writer on economics  and the Middle East, including as a regular contributor to the Huffington Post.

Early life and education
Ahmed was born and raised in Pakistan, where he attended the Karachi Grammar School. He obtained his graduate and post-graduate degrees in Economics from the London School of Economics, where he also served on the economics faculty.

Career
Between 1979 and 2000, Ahmed held a number of positions in the World Bank. He worked for 10 years on country programs and projects in different regions and, for a further 10 years, on international economic policy relating to debt, aid effectiveness, trade and global economic prospects. As Vice President for Poverty Reduction and Economic Management, Ahmed was the senior World Bank manager responsible for the development of the Poverty Reduction Strategy Paper approach as well as the HIPC Debt Initiative. He also served concurrently for a year as Acting Vice President for Private Sector Development and Infrastructure.

Between 2000 and 2003, Ahmed was deputy director in the IMF's Policy Development and Review Department. In this role, he served as the senior staff for taking forward the IMF's policy work, in support of low income member countries and its relationship with the World Bank and other development agencies. From 2003 until 2006, Ahmed served as Director General for Policy and International Development at the UK Government's Department for International Development (DFID).

In 2006, Ahmed returned to the IMF as Director of the External Relations Department. From 2008, he served as the IMF's Director of Middle East and Central Asia Department.

Since 2017, Ahmed has been serving the Center for Global Development (CGD) as new president, succeeding founding president Nancy Birdsall.

In early 2021, Ahmed was appointed by the G20 as project director in charge of the High Level Independent Panel (HLIP) on financing the global commons for pandemic preparedness and response, co-chaired by Ngozi Okonjo-Iweala, Tharman Shanmugaratnam and Lawrence Summers. Later that year, he was appointed to the World Bank–International Monetary Fund High-Level Advisory Group (HLAG) on Sustainable and Inclusive Recovery and Growth, co-chaired by Mari Pangestu, Ceyla Pazarbasioglu, and Nicholas Stern.

Ahmed was appointed Knight Commander of the Order of St Michael and St George (KCMG) in the 2023 New Year Honours for services to international development.

References

Year of birth missing (living people)
Living people
Pakistani economists
International Monetary Fund people
Alumni of the London School of Economics
Pakistani officials of the United Nations
British economists
Pakistani emigrants to the United Kingdom
British officials of the United Nations
Naturalised citizens of the United Kingdom
Knights Commander of the Order of St Michael and St George